Richard Carter was a land agent and surveyor in Halifax, West Yorkshire, England. In 1846 he had both Thomas Archer Hirst and John Tyndall working for him. He introduced them, thereby cementing some of the first bonds in the famous X Club to which T H Huxley and others also belonged.

References
Roy M. MacLeod (1970) "The X-Club: a Social Network of Science in Late-Victorian England," Notes and Records of the Royal Society of London, Vol. 24, No. 2. (Apr. 1970), pp. 305–322.

19th-century births
19th-century deaths
19th-century English people